Trekking (foaled 20 October 2014) is a multiple Group 1 winning Australian thoroughbred racehorse.

Background
Trekking was bred at the Australian Darley Stud and was sired by the stallion Street Cry.

Racing career
Trekking made a successful debut as a 2 year old when ridden to victory by James Doyle at Rosehill Racecourse as a 9/10 favourite.

At his following start Trekking finished 2nd in the Black Opal Stakes before finishing 12th in the Golden Slipper behind She Will Reign when ridden by William Buick.

As a 4 year old Trekking achieved Group 1 success in  the Stradbroke Handicap when ridden by Kerrin McEvoy at odds of 6/1

Trekking won his second Group 1 race when successful in The Goodwood at Morphettville Racecourse.

In the 2020 World's Best Racehorse Rankings, Trekking was rated on 118, making him the equal 80th best racehorse in the world.

References 
 

Racehorses bred in Australia
2014 racehorse births
Racehorses trained in Australia
Thoroughbred family 19-b